The 2021 Pan American Gymnastics Championships was held in Rio de Janeiro, Brazil in June 2021.  Three gymnastics disciplines were contested: artistic gymnastics (from June 4–6), rhythmic gymnastics (from June 11–13) and trampoline (from June 11–13).  The event was originally to be held in the United States but was changed due to concerns around the COVID-19 pandemic.  The event serves as qualification to the 2020 Olympic Games.

Medalists

Artistic gymnastics 

Notes
On June 23, 2021, Argentinian gymnast Martina Dominici was provisionally suspended for using a banned substance during the 2021 Pan American Championships. Dominici's scores have been removed from the official results. She had previously won the vault gold medal, all-around and floor exercise silver medals, and the uneven bars bronze medal, along with a bronze medal with the team.

Rhythmic gymnastics

Trampoline gymnastics

Medal table

See also
 2021 Junior Pan American Artistic Gymnastics Championships
 2021 Junior Pan American Rhythmic Gymnastics Championships

References 

Pan American Gymnastics
Pan American Gymnastics Championships
International gymnastics competitions hosted by Brazil
Pan American Gymnastics Championships
Pan American Gymnastics Championships